RuPaul's Drag Race Down Under is a reality competition streaming television series based on the American television series of the same name produced by World of Wonder and Warner Bros. International Television Production New Zealand. The show documents RuPaul and a panel of judges' search for "Down Under's next drag superstar". RuPaul plays several roles on the show including host, mentor and head judge for the series, as the contestants are given different challenges to participate in each week. The show also employs a panel of judges: RuPaul, Michelle Visage, and Rhys Nicholson. The series premiered on TVNZ 2 and TVNZ OnDemand in New Zealand, Stan in Australia, and on WOW Presents Plus internationally on 1 May 2021. The series is also streaming on BBC Three and BBC iPlayer in the United Kingdom, and broadcast by both Crave and its associated streaming service in Canada.

The ten drag queens compete for the title of the "Down Under's first Drag Superstar", a one-year supply of Revolution Beauty Cosmetics, and a cash prize of $30,000. The winner of the first season of RuPaul's Drag Race Down Under was Kita Mean.

In September 2021, the series was renewed for a second season. Casting closed on 5 October 2021. It premiered on July 30, 2022.

Format
Like the American version, RuPaul has several roles within the show, acting as host, coach and judge. As the host, RuPaul introduces celebrity guests, announces the challenges the queens will take part in each week, and reveals who will be leaving the competition. For his role as a coach, RuPaul offers guidance to the contestants through each challenge, and as a judge he critiques the queens on their overall performance of the challenge. The show uses progressive elimination to reduce the number of drag queens in the competition from the initial field of ten contestants (series 1), down to the final four. Each episode follows a format consisting of a mini challenge, a maxi challenge, a runway walk (where the contestants model fashion on a runway, usually with a theme based on the main challenge), the judging panel, a lip sync battle, and the elimination of a contestant.

Mini challenges
In mini challenges, each contestant is asked to perform a different task with varying requirements and time limitations. Certain mini challenges are repeated from series to series, or repeated from the original American season. For instance, the first mini challenge is a photo shoot with a photographer or RuPaul himself, that includes a special twist (such as being doused with water while in full drag, having a high-powered fan turned on during the shoot, or being photographed while jumping on a trampoline). One recurring mini challenge is dedicated to "reading", a drag term for making insulting observations about one's peers for comedic effect, inspired by Paris Is Burning. The winner of a mini challenge is sometimes rewarded with an advantage in the main challenge. Though most episodes have a mini challenge, select episodes do not.

Maxi challenges and runways
The requirements of the maxi challenge vary across each episode, and can be individual or group challenges. The winner of the maxi challenge also receives a special prize for their win. The final maxi challenge consisted of the queens taking part in an all-singing and all-dancing routine to one of RuPaul's songs.

The goal of each maxi challenge involves a new theme and outcome. Contestants are often asked to design and construct a custom outfit, sometimes incorporating unconventional materials. Other challenges focus on the contestants' ability to present themselves on camera, perform with music, or perform humorously. Some challenges became a tradition across seasons, such as the "Snatch Game" (in which the contestants impersonate celebrities as a parody of Match Game), a ball or a makeover, in which the contestants create drag personas for other people. The contestants walk down a runway presenting outfits. If the maxi challenge involves the creation of an outfit, that outfit is presented to the judges in the runway. Otherwise, a theme is assigned and the contestants must put together a look that fits the theme, which is presented to the judges. The runway looks and presentation are judged along with the maxi challenge performance.

Judging panel
A panel of judges cast opinions about the challenge performances and runway looks, first to the contestants onstage, and then again with them offstage.

RuPaul acted as both the host and main judge, with Michelle Visage and Rhys Nicholson as supporting judges.

The show made an unsuccessful attempt to book New Zealand Prime Minister Jacinda Ardern for some form of appearance, either as a guest judge or making a cameo appearance in the workroom. Ardern declined, citing scheduling issues.

Companion series
There are web series also accompanying each episode of Drag Race. How's Your Head, Queen?, features Michelle Visage checking in with the newly eliminated queen from RuPaul's Drag Race Down Under to chat about their experience, their passions, the future, and more. Fashion Photo Ruview, aired for the first season, co-hosted by Raja and Raven who evaluate the runway looks of the main show. Binge Queens with Kita Mean, Angeria Paris VanMicheals, Jasmine Kennedie and June Jambalaya who threw a couch kiki for a weekly watch party for RuPaul's Drag Race Down Under (season 2).

Series overview

Season 1 (2021) 

The first season of RuPaul's Drag Race Down Under began airing on 1 May 2021 on Stan in Australia, TVNZ 2 in New Zealand and World of Wonder's WOW Presents Plus streaming service internationally, and ran for 8 episodes. The judging panel included RuPaul, Michelle Visage and Rhys Nicholson. The cast was announced on 6 March on YouTube. Art Simone, Karen from Finance, Kita Mean and Scarlet Adams made it to the final, with Kita Mean being crowned Down Under's first Drag Superstar.

Season 2 (2022)

The second season was confirmed and casting was opened on 9 September 2021. Casting closed on Tuesday October 5.

TVNZ Director of Content Cate Slater said that TVNZ will be partnering with Stan, World of Wonder, Passion Distribution and Warner Bros. International Television Production New Zealand for another season of RuPaul's Drag Race Down Under due to film in New Zealand and premiere in 2022."

According to media reports, the season began filming on 18 January and was scheduled to run through to 14 February 2022. Season 1 judges Michelle Visage and Rhys Nicholson were spotted in south Auckland around this time, leading to speculation that both would be returning to judge season 2. The winner of the second season of RuPaul's Drag Race Down Under was Spankie Jackzon, with Hannah Conda and Kween Kong as runners-up.

Season 3 (2023)
The third season was confirmed and casting was opened on 24 October 2022. Casting closed on 13 November 2022 at 12:00am PST.

Contestants 

There has been a total of 20 contestants featured in RuPaul's Drag Race Down Under.

Discography

Awards and nominations

References

External links

  (Australia)
  (New Zealand)

 
2020s LGBT-related reality television series
2021 Australian television series debuts
2021 New Zealand television series debuts
2021 web series debuts
2020s Australian reality television series
Australian television series based on American television series
Australian non-fiction web series
Impact of the COVID-19 pandemic on the LGBT community
Australian LGBT-related web series
New Zealand reality television series
New Zealand television series based on American television series
Stan (service) original programming
Television series by World of Wonder (company)
Television series by Warner Bros. Television Studios
Television series impacted by the COVID-19 pandemic
Television shows filmed in New Zealand
TVNZ original programming
WOW Presents Plus original programming